is a Japanese manga artist known for illustrating the GetBackers series. Since the completion of Get Backers, he has been working on a new manga series called Holy Talker.

Works 
  (1999–2007 Kodansha) Illustrator; English translation: (2004–2009 Tokyopop)
  (2008— Kodansha)
  (2010— Kodansha) Illustrator
  (2011— Shogakukan) Script

References

External links 
 

1974 births
Living people
Manga artists from Hyōgo Prefecture